Jumaine Lanard Jones (born February 10, 1979) is an American former professional basketball player. An NBA player from 1999 to 2007 drafted from the University of Georgia, he played the small forward and power forward positions.

Amateur career

Known as the "Thrilla From Camilla",  Jones is originally from Cocoa, Florida, he moved to South Georgia as a freshman, where he played competitive high school basketball in the tiny town of Camilla, Georgia.  There he honed his skills and as a senior became a 1997 2nd Team Parade All-American, averaging 32.8ppg 13.5rbs 3.7ast & 2.6blks per game.  He spent two standout seasons at the University of Georgia.  As a freshman Jones shared the Freshman of the Year award with University of Tennessee guard Tony Harris in 1997-98 season, leading the team in scoring and rebounding averaging 14.7ppg 8.5rbs & 1.0ast.  Building on a good freshman campaign, Jones became the first UGA sophomore to lead the SEC in scoring since Vern Fleming in 1984, averaging 18.8ppg 9.5rbs & 1.2stls.  Additionally, in 1998-99 season, he was the first sophomore in school history to score 1,000 points since Dominique Wilkins did so in 1981.  That year, he was also selected to represent the U.S. at the 1998 Goodwill Games.  On the 1998 Goodwill Games Team, Jones started all 5 games alongside future 1999 NBA overall 1st pick Elton Brand as wells as overall 6th pick Wally Szczerbiak and 8th Andre Miller.

Professional career

NBA
Declaring himself eligible for the 1999 NBA draft, he was selected by the Atlanta Hawks with the 27th overall pick, but he was immediately traded to the Philadelphia 76ers, where he spent two years. On December 30, 1999, against the Portland Trail Blazers, Jones became a part of NBA history when he scored the final basket of the 1990s. As the 76ers became the 2001 Eastern Conference champions, Jones started throughout the postseason after current starter George Lynch went down with an injury, including the 2001 NBA Finals, in which the Los Angeles Lakers defeated the 76ers in five games.  Jones' best game of the 2001 NBA playoffs came in game 7 of the Eastern Conference Semis against the Vince Carter-led Toronto Raptors.  Jones played 31 minutes going 6-9 from the field and tallying 16 points, 4 rebounds, and an assist.

He then played two years with the Cleveland Cavaliers, before being traded to the Boston Celtics. In Boston, he suffered an injury early into the season and limited his appearances. In 2004, he was sent to the Los Angeles Lakers, but only when the deal was renegotiated after Gary Payton initially refused to report to the Celtics. On October 26, 2005, Jones was traded to the Charlotte Bobcats in exchange for a future second-round draft pick. On August 31, 2006, he signed a one-year contract with the Phoenix Suns. Jones was signed as an unrestricted free agent by the New Jersey Nets on October 1, 2007, but he was waived later that month.

International
He signed a one-year contract with Basket Napoli on October 24, 2007. With Napoli, Jones averaged 17.9 points and 8.4 rebounds per game. On July 21, 2008, Jones signed a contract with PBC Ural Great Perm of the Russian Basketball Super League. With Ural, Jones averaged 7.4 points, 5.2 rebounds, and 1.4 assists.

In July 2009, he signed a contract with Juvecaserta Basket. In July 2011, he signed with Victoria Libertas Pesaro. In 2012, he joined Bnei Herzliya of Israel. In 2013, he signed with the Mets de Guaynabo in Puerto Rico.

He also had a small stint with Lebanese Basketball League powerhouse Sagesse Club Beirut.

In September 2013, he signed a one-year deal with Levski Sofia.

On December 3, 2014 he signed with Mexican team Titánicos de León.

Career statistics

Domestic leagues

References

External links

  NBA.com profile
 Georgia Bulldogs biography

1979 births
Living people
African-American basketball players
American expatriate basketball people in Bulgaria
American expatriate basketball people in Israel
American expatriate basketball people in Italy
American expatriate basketball people in Lebanon
American expatriate basketball people in Mexico
American expatriate basketball people in Russia
American men's basketball players
Atlanta Hawks draft picks
Baloncesto Superior Nacional players
Basket Napoli players
Basketball players from Florida
Basketball players from Georgia (U.S. state)
BC Levski Sofia players
Bnei Hertzeliya basketball players
Boston Celtics players
Charlotte Bobcats players
Cleveland Cavaliers players
Fuerza Guinda de Nogales players
Georgia Bulldogs basketball players
Goodwill Games medalists in basketball
Juvecaserta Basket players
Lega Basket Serie A players
Los Angeles Lakers players
Parade High School All-Americans (boys' basketball)
PBC Ural Great players
People from Camilla, Georgia
People from Cocoa, Florida
Philadelphia 76ers players
Phoenix Suns players
Power forwards (basketball)
Small forwards
Victoria Libertas Pallacanestro players
Competitors at the 1998 Goodwill Games
Sagesse SC basketball players
21st-century African-American sportspeople
20th-century African-American sportspeople